Haidergarh railway station is a railway station in Barabanki district, Uttar Pradesh. Its code is HGH. It serves Haidergarh town. The station consists of two platforms. The main line of the Oudh and Rohilkhand Railway from Lucknow to Rae Bareli and Mughal Sarai serves the south-western portion.

See also 

 Varanasi Junction railway station
 Sultanpur Junction railway station
 Varanasi–Sultanpur–Lucknow line

References

External links 

 HGH/Haidergarh

Railway stations in Barabanki district
Lucknow NR railway division